Tolistobogii (in other sources Tolistobogioi, Tolistobōgioi, Tolistoboioi, Tolistobioi, Toligistobogioi or Tolistoagioi) is the name used by the Roman historian, Livy, for one of the three ancient Gallic tribes of Galatia in central Asia Minor, together with the Trocmi and Tectosages. The tribe entered Anatolia in 279 BC as a contingent of Celtic raiders from the Danube region, and settled in those regions of Phrygia which would later become part of the Roman province of Galatia. The Galatians retained their Celtic language through the 4th century AD, when Saint Jerome mentions that the Galatians still spoke a Celtic language in his times.

Etymology and identity
The name is believed to be a karmadhāraya compound of two Proto-Celtic roots: the first, *tolisto-, is of uncertain meaning, but perhaps related to Old Irish tol "will, desire"; Ludwig Rübekeil conjectures it to be an adjectival derivation from a Celtic root *tel- in an archaic and not well-attested formation of the superlative, and tentatively translates the name as "the most enduring, hardest". A non-Celtic origin for the root *tolisto- is also possible.  The second root, *bogio-, means "beat, pound" and is a common element in Celtic personal names (cf. Gaulish Andecombogius, Combogiomārus, Namantobogius, Uercombogius; also Old Irish bong "batter" and Welsh -abwy [<Proto-Celtic *adbogio-] in names such as Rhonabwy and Iunabwy).

Geography
The Tolistobogii for the greater part of their centuries-long stay in Galatia were located in what is now Eskişehir Province just to the west of Ankara.

History
The Tolistobogii first appear as troops in the army of Brennus on its way to plunder Delphi in Greece in 279 BC. In Dardania, it is said, some 20,000 men under Leonorius and Lutarius in these three tribes seceded from Brennus and entered Thrace, where they collected tribute from the region, including Byzantium. Subsequently, they crossed the Hellespont to fight as mercenaries for Nicomedes I of Bithynia and then left Bithynia to plunder Anatolia. The Tolistobogii received Aeolia and Ionia as territory. According to Plutach, the historian Polybius met and talked with Chiomara, wife of Ortagion, chieftain of the Tolistobogii who united them into a powerful state against Rome in 189 BC. Chiomara was captured and raped by a centurion who, when he found out her seniority, demanded a ransom from Ortagion. Whilst the ransom was being delivered, Chiomara had the centurion decapitated and took his head to her husband.

References

Ancient Galatia
Gauls
Boii
Historical Celtic peoples